Michele Beaton is a Canadian politician, who was elected to the Legislative Assembly of Prince Edward Island in the 2019 Prince Edward Island general election. She represents the district of Mermaid-Stratford as a member of the Green Party of Prince Edward Island.

Personal life 
Her father, Glen Beaton ran in Cardigan at the 2019 federal election.

Electoral record

References 

Living people
People from Queens County, Prince Edward Island
Green Party of Prince Edward Island MLAs
Women MLAs in Prince Edward Island
21st-century Canadian politicians
Year of birth missing (living people)
21st-century Canadian women politicians